The Chanute Formation is a geologic formation in Kansas, Missouri, and Oklahoma. It preserves fossils dating back to the Carboniferous period.

See also

 List of fossiliferous stratigraphic units in Missouri
 Paleontology in Missouri

References
 

Carboniferous Kansas
Carboniferous Missouri
Carboniferous geology of Oklahoma
Carboniferous southern paleotropical deposits